The Clemson Tigers women's soccer team represent Clemson University in the Atlantic Coast Conference of NCAA Division I soccer. The team has won 1 Atlantic Coast Conference regular season championship, shared 1 regular season title and advanced to the NCAA Women's soccer tournament 19 times.

Colors and Badge
The team uses the school colors of Orange and Regalia.

History

1990s
The Clemson women's soccer team was founded in 1994.  The program enjoyed early success under its first coach Tracey Leone.  The team tied for second place in the Atlantic Coast Conference during this period and made the NCAA tournament in every year.  The Tigers also reached the ACC tournament final twice during this period.  The team's best finish was a quarterfinals appearance in 1998.  In 1999, Tracey Leone was replaced as head coach by Ray Leone.

2000s
The team's good fortunes continued in the 2000s finishing no lower than third in the ACC in the first four seasons.  Ray Leone left as Head Coach in 2000 and was replaced by Todd Bramble. The team could not quite match the success of the early 2000s, never finishing above fourth in the ACC between 2004 and 2010.  The Tigers continued to make the NCAA tournament.  They made the tournament every season under Bramble.  Their best result was the Quarterfinals in 2008.  In 2008, Bramble left as coach and was replaced with Hershey Strosberg. The team took a sharp decline under Strosberg, finishing tenth or below in the ACC in each of his three seasons in charge.  The team failed to make the NCAA tournament in those three years, ending a streak of 14 consecutive appearances.

2010s
Strosberg was fired in 2010 and replaced with Eddie Radwanski.  Radwanski's teams improved in each of their first three seasons but could not finish above tenth in the ACC and failed to make the NCAA tournament.  A six win improvement from 2013 to 2014 saw the Tigers finish fifth in the ACC and return to the NCAA tournament.  The Tigers have made the NCAA tournament during the next two seasons and recorded double digit wins from 2014 to 2019.  The team advanced farther in each NCAA tournament appearance during 2014–16, including a Sweet 16 trip in 2016, their first trip to the Sweet 16 since 2001.  The Tigers could not repeat the feat in the last three years of the decade, making the Second Round twice (2017 and 2019), but falling there in each year.

Hazing Lawsuit
In 2014, a lawsuit was brought against Clemson University, Clemson University administrators, three women's soccer team coaches, and 16 women's soccer team players by Haley Hunt.  Hunt was a member of the team from 2011 to 2013.  The lawsuit claims that Hunt was subjected to hazing during her time with the team and the hazing caused significant physical harm. As of 2016, Hunt has settled with all but one of the defendants named in the case.

2020s
The decade started with a season shortened by the COVID-19 pandemic.  The team played a non-conference schedule in the spring of 2021 and played a shortened eight game conference schedule.  The team finished fourth in the ACC with a 5–3–0 record, but could not advance past the first round of the ACC Tournament.  However, the NCAA Tournament in the spring proved to be a high-water mark for the team.  They advanced to the Quarterfinals for the first time since 2006 before losing to Santa Clara.  In a more normal regular season in 2021, Clemson went 12–7–1 and 6–3–1 in ACC play.  They made the Semifinals of the ACC Tournament but were unable to advance past the First Round of the NCAA Tournament.  In 2021, Clemson posted a 8–5–5 overall record and 4–3–3 record in ACC play.  They finished in 7th place, which broke a streak of four-straight ACC Tournament qualifications.  They received an at-large bid to the NCAA Tournament but lost again in the First Round.  The 8 total wins and 4 ACC wins were their lowest totals since 2013.

Personnel

Current roster

Team management

Source:

Seasons

Notable alumni

Current Professional Players
  Beth Goetz (1994–1995) Currently Ball State Athletic Director
  Ashley Phillips – (2004–2007) Currently head coach at Northwestern
  Kailen Sheridan – (2013–2016) Currently with San Diego Wave and Canada international
  Sam Staab – (2015–2018) Currently with Washington Spirit
  Sandy MacIver – (2016–2019) Currently with Manchester City and England international
  Mariana Speckmaier – (2017–2020) Currently with Valur and Venezuela international

References

Works cited

External links
 

 
Soccer clubs in South Carolina
NCAA Division I women's soccer teams